Rishikaa Singh Chandel (born 1 September 1995) is an Indian television actress who works in the television industry. She is known for playing Damini as lead role in Doordarshan's Nayi Soch serial. Her father Yashwant Singh is a business man and her mother Archana Singh is a house wife.

Early life
Rishikaa was born on the 01st September in the year 1995. She has done her schooling from S.D.S. Public School, Chhapra, Bihar. She has done Master in Journalism & Mass Communication from the Nalanda Open University, Patna, Bihar. She is from Chhapra, Saran, Bihar.

Career
Rishikaa Singh Chandel made her television debut on Sony TV with CID in 2017. She then performed in Dulari serial on Doordarshan. She also acted in Bhabi Ji Ghar Par Hain on Colors TV, Savdhaan India on Life OK, Jai Santoshi Maa on &TV, Vidhya on Colors TV.

Currently, she has been portraying Damini in Doordarshan's Nayi Soch as a lead actor.
 She is playing the  negative lead role in  LovePanti in which her character's name is Sarita. This show is on air   MxPlayer and Azaad TV .

Television

Awards and recognition

References

External links
 Rishikaa Singh Chandel on Instagram
 Rishikaa Singh Chandel on Facebook
 Rishikaa Singh Chandel on koo
 Rishikaa Singh Chandel on YouTube
 Rishikaa Singh Chandel on Twitter

Indian television actresses
Living people
1995 births